Norrskär may refer to:

 , an island in Finland
 SS Norrskär, a steamship in the fleet of the Waxholmsbolaget in Sweden